Helian Duo (赫連鐸) (died 894) was an ethnically-Tuyuhun warlord in late Tang Dynasty.  He had a long-running enmity with the Shatuo chieftain Li Keyong, and was killed by Li Keyong in 894.

Background and initial campaign against Li Keyong 
Little is known about Helian Duo's background, including his birth year, other than that, as of the time of Emperor Yizong, he was then a Tuyuhun chief and carried the Tang-bestowed title of commandant of Yin Mountains.  Later, when Tang imperial forces had to battle a rebellion led by Pang Xun at Xu Prefecture (徐州, in modern Xuzhou, Jiangsu), Helian participated in the campaign.

In 878, the Shatuo chieftain Li Guochang and his son Li Keyong rose against the rule of Emperor Yizong's son and successor Emperor Xizong at Zhenwu (振武, headquartered in modern Hohhot, Inner Mongolia) and Datong (大同, headquartered in modern Datong, Shanxi) Circuits, respectively.  Emperor Xizong ordered Helian, as well as the Tang military governors (Jiedushi) Li Jun (李均) the military governor of Zhaoyi Circuit (昭義, headquartered in modern Changzhi, Shanxi) and Li Keju the military governor of Lulong Circuit (盧龍, headquartered in modern Beijing), Helian's fellow Tuyuhun chieftain Bai Yicheng (白義誠), and the Sage (薩葛) chieftain Mi Haiwan (米海萬) to attack Li Guochang and Li Keyong.  In summer 879, when Li Keyong was personally defending against an attack by Li Keju, Li Keyong left his officer Gao Wenji (高文集) in command of his base at Shuo Prefecture (朔州, in modern Shuozhou, Shanxi).  Helian persuaded Gao to submit to the new Tang-commissioned military governor of Datong, Li Zhuo (李琢), and Gao surrendered with the Shatuo chieftain Li Youjin (李友金), Mi, and Shi Jingcun, after arresting fellow officer Fu Wenda (傅文達).  When Li Keyong tried to return to Shuo to attack Gao, Li Keju defeated him.  Li Zhuo and Helian then attacked Li Guochang at Wei Prefecture (蔚州, in modern Zhangjiakou, Hebei) and defeated him as well.  Li Guochang and Li Keyong were forced to flee to the Dada (達靼) tribe, then near the Yin Mountains.  For his accomplishments against the Shatuo, Helian was made the prefect of Datong's capital Yun Prefecture (雲州) and the defender of Datong Circuit.

Control of Yun Prefecture 
Soon after Helian Duo was commissioned the defender of Datong, he sent bribes to the Dada chiefs, asking them to kill Li Guochang and Li Keyong.  Li Keyong, however, found out about this, and was able to impress the Dada chiefs of his archery ability at a banquet, and further proclaimed that he had no intent to stay in Dada lands long, thus alleviating their fears about him.  In 882, when Li Keyong tried to recapture Wei Prefecture, Helian and Li Keju battled him, along with Qibi Zhang (契苾璋) the military governor of Zhenwu, but were not able to defeat him.

In 885, by which time Li Keyong, due to his great accomplishments in defeating the major agrarian rebel Huang Chao for the Tang imperial government, had been given the military governorship of Hedong Circuit (河東, headquartered in Taiyuan, Shanxi), both Li Keju and Wang Rong the military governor of Chengde Circuit (成德, headquartered in modern Shijiazhuang, Hebei) feared the strength that Li Keyong showed and his alliance with their neighbor Wang Chucun the military governor of Yiwu Circuit (義武, headquartered in modern Baoding, Hebei).  They decided to attack and destroy Wang Chucun, and, to prevent Li Keyong from coming to Wang Chucun's aid, they persuaded Helian to attack Li Keyong.  Helian did so, but was not able to prevent Li Keyong from aiding Wang Chucun to fight off the Chengde/Lulong invasion.  (After the failed attack, Li Keju was defeated by his own officer Li Quanzhong, who mutinied. Li Keju committed suicide and Li Quanzhong succeeded him.)

In 890, Li Keyong launched a major attack against Helian and captured the eastern part of Yun Prefecture.  Helian sought aid from Li Quanzhong's son and successor Li Kuangwei, who came to his aid.  Li Keyong's officer An Jinjun (安金俊) was killed by an arrow, and Shen Xin (申信) surrendered to Helian.  Li Keyong was forced to withdraw.

As a result of Li Keyong's attack on Helian, Helian and Li Kuangwei submitted petitions to Emperor Xizong's brother and successor Emperor Zhaozong, asking the emperor to declare a general campaign against Li Keyong.  They were concurred in by Li Keyong's rival Zhu Quanzhong the military governor of Xuanwu Circuit (宣武, headquartered in modern Kaifeng, Henan), as well as the chancellors Zhang Jun and Kong Wei.  Emperor Zhaozong thus declared a general campaign against Li Keyong, with Zhang in command.  As part of the operations against Li Keyong, Li Kuangwei and Helian were to attack Li Keyong from the north.  They had initial successes, as Li Kuangwei captured Wei Prefecture, and Helian, along with Tufan and Xiajiasi tribesmen, attacked Zhelu Base (遮虜軍, in modern Xinzhou, Shanxi), killing its defender Liu Huzi (劉胡子).  However, Li Keyong then sent a major force under his adoptive sons Li Cunxin and Li Siyuan, and they defeated Li Kuangwei and Helian, capturing Li Kuangwei's son Li Renzong (李仁宗) and Helian's son-in-law, forcing them to withdraw.  Zhang's main operations against Li Keyong subsequently collapsed under pressure from Li Keyong.  Faced with defeat, Emperor Zhaozong was forced to restore all of Li Keyong's titles.

Li Keyong then attacked Yun Prefecture again in 891, putting it under siege.  After Helian ran out of food supplies, he was forced to abandon Yun Prefecture and flee, initially to fellow Tuyuhun tribesmen, and then to Lulong's capital You Prefecture (幽州).

Defeat and death 
In fall 892, Helian Duo and Li Kuangwei launched an attack to try to recapture Yun Prefecture.  At that time, Li Keyong happened to be at Tianning Base (天寧, in modern Xinzhou), and he immediately ordered his officer Li Junqing (李君慶) to launch an army from his headquarters at Taiyuan, while he himself made a surprise attack against Helian and Li Kuangwei, capturing some 300 Tuyuhun scouts.  Soon, when Li Junqing arrived, Li Keyong entered Yun Prefecture, and then again attacked and defeated Helian and Li Kuangwei.  Helian and Li Kuangwei were forced to flee.

In summer 893, Li Keyong launched another attack on the Tuyuhun tribesmen.  He killed Helian and captured Bai Yicheng, thus ending the Tuyuhun resistance against him.

Notes and references 

 Zizhi Tongjian, vols. 253, 254, 256, 258, 259.

9th-century births
894 deaths
Tuyuhun
Tang dynasty jiedushi
People from North China